Aweer (Aweera), also known as Boni (Bon, Bonta), is a Cushitic language of Eastern Kenya. The Aweer people, known by the arguably derogatory exonym "Boni," are historically a hunter-gatherer people, traditionally subsisting on hunting, gathering, and collecting honey. Their ancestral lands range along the Kenyan coast from the Lamu and Ijara Districts into Southern Somalia's Badaade District.

According to Ethnologue, there are around 8,000 speakers of Aweer. Aweer has similarities with the Garre language, however, its speakers are ethnically distinct from Garre speakers.

Historical situation 
There is suggestions that the Aweer speech community are remnants of the early hunter-gatherer inhabitants of Eastern Africa; although this is not without debate among specialists and unlike the neighboring speakers of the Dahalo language, there is no concrete linguistic evidence of a shift from a prior language; it is best said that the possibility of said shift is more so based on assumptions regarding their status as foragers as opposed to linguistic evidence of the same sort found in neighboring languages. As noted in Heine (1982:141), the debate regarding the situation of if the Aweer have or have not shifted from a prior language is as follows:

 The forest was inhabited by non-Sam(East Omo-Tana)-speaking people, who, as a result of contacts with Sam pastoralists along the forest fringes, adopted a Sam language. This would imply that the Boni relationship with the Sam people is merely a linguistic one; their cultural origin would have to be sought with those hunter-gatherers who lived in the forest prior to the arrival of the Eastern Sam.
 Part of the Eastern Sam, i.e. the immediate ancestors of the Boni, entered the coastal forest and adopted a hunter-gatherer existence. Such a development is likely to have been caused by war, stock raiding or ecological distress, forcing the Same people to give up their livestock economy.

Tosco (1994) notes that Heine agrees with the second historical scenario, and as Tosco (1994:155) goes on to state:

Further on in the same paper, Tosco does note that there is oral traditions among the Aweer ethnic community that they had at one point had cattle and as a result of losing them (and presumably their social status) they had become foragers. A similar view can be found in Stiles (1988:41-42), and the general consensus is that while the actual origin of the Aweer and their language is something that is not known definitively, it is likely that they at one point were not foragers. A competing hypothesis, and perhaps equally plausible one in the same vein as Heine's first scenario, is put forth by Tosco (1994:159) that links the emergence of Aweer to the expansion of Garre-speakers from the northeast:

He then notes that in a forthcoming work to be published, Tosco (1992), that there is loans of East Omo-Tana (or in his words, "Somali") origin within Dahalo that could have only been loaned by either Aweer or Garre, such as the verb šir- (IPA: [ʃir-]) 'to be there, to exist' which demonstrates the sound change *k > [ʃ] /_i and the verb 'unneed- (IPA: [ʔunneːd]) 'to swallow' which demonstrates another sound shift found in both Garre and Aweer, *ʕ >[ʔ] along with the semantic shift of 'to eat' > 'to swallow'; which itself is found in Aweer. Conversely, these could also be loans from Aweer into Dahalo. A similar viewpoint can be found in Nurse (2019).

Phonology 
The phonemic inventory reconstructed for Proto-Aweer (the last common stage of all Aweer dialects) is as follows:

References

External links
AWEER

Further reading 
 
 

Omo–Tana languages
Languages of Kenya